Age Hains Boersma (born 12 March 1982) is a Dutch former professional footballer, who currently plays amateur football for Hoofdklasse side Sneek Wit Zwart.

Club career
Boersma started his professional career at SC Heerenveen, when he was snapped up from Sneek in 2006 and made his debut in February 2007 against Roda JC. He was loaned and later sold to Veendam during the 2007/08 season.

In summer 2008, Boersma retired from professional football to focus on a career outside the sport. He rejoined amateur side VV Sneek and later played for Flevo Boys and Harkemase Boys before returning to Sneek once more in 2013.

In March 2015 he became Sneek's all-time top goalscorer when he netted his 100th and 101st goal for the club.

References

1982 births
Living people
People from Nijefurd 
Association football forwards
Dutch footballers
SC Heerenveen players
SC Veendam players
Eredivisie players
Eerste Divisie players
Derde Divisie players
Harkemase Boys players
Vierde Divisie players
Eerste Klasse players
Footballers from Friesland
VV Sneek Wit Zwart players
Flevo Boys players